Yamaha Pro Audio, Inc. is a division of the Yamaha Corporation that offers a complete line of beginner professional audio products for the live sound and sound reinforcement markets. It has a long history of introducing significant products for the professional audio market such as the PM-1000 modular mixing console, the REV1 and SPX90 digital signal processors, and the 01, 02R, 03D, PM1D, PM5D, QL5, M7CL, CL5, and PM10/7 Rivage digital mixing consoles.

Yamaha products have received the most nominations in the area of technical achievement in the TEC Foundation TEC Awards 20-year history.

History

Products

The PM series of analog mixing consoles

The first PM mixer manufactured by Yamaha was the PM200.  Introduced in 1972, it was a monaural mixer with unbalanced inputs and outputs

The PM400 was an upgraded mixer with a stereo bus and balanced inputs and outputs.

The Yamaha PM1000 mixing console was a significant product in the professional audio industry because of its many advanced features and reasonable price.  Introduced in 1974 it incorporated many innovative features such as a modular design using channel strips and output strips, a 4 bus design, and an output matrix mixer.  Because it was manufactured by an established company it was readily accepted in many audio industries including sound reinforcement, recording, and audio for video. It also established a reputation for being rugged in the often abusive environment of touring sound reinforcement.

The PM2000 featured a hard chassis construction for rigidity and durability on the road.

"One of the tests we are still using is our 'flight case test'. During prototyping we order a custom flight case - not even a very sturdy one - and place the console in it. The flight case is stood on end, and then tipped over in both directions and allowed to fall to the floor. If the console powers up immediately and works flawless after that ordeal, then it passes the test."

The PM3000 was the first mixer to use voltage-controlled amplifiers (VCAs) in a mixer designed specifically for sound reinforcement.  It used a custom VCA design using discrete hybrid ICs

The PM4000 introduced stereo auxiliary buses and fully parametric Equalization on the input channels.

The PM5000 was a hybrid analog mixer with a digital control system which provided scene recall.

In 1999, Yamaha debuted a first of its kind, all digital large format console, The PM1D system. With scalable I/O configuration the total channel count could be brought up to 320 mic inputs.  Though, to achieve this impressive channel count, the system required multiple modular I/O boxes along with separate Digital Signal Processor(DSP) racks, power supply racks, and computer system engines.

Yamaha's next desk, the PM5D did away with the external rack system, reducing the channel count to 48 mic pres, and requiring only an external power supply unit.

The Yamaha PM5D-RH(remote head-amp) was all of the functionality of a PM5D in a 10 space rack that only required a PM5D-RH control surface.

In 2007, Yamaha won a Technical Grammy for its NS-10 studio monitor, a speaker that dominated the mixing of pop and rock music throughout the world for at least 20 years. The speaker was inducted into the Mix magazine TECnology Hall of Fame in 2008.

The M7CL console was launched in 2005 and the LS9 in 2006.

The CL Series and the smaller QL series were launched in 2012 and 2014, and were the first digital audio consoles to incorporate the Dante protocol.

In 2014,  Yamaha announced the release of a new PM series digital console,  the PM10 Rivage system, equipped with Rupert Neve Designed "Silk" modeling pre-amps.

See also
 List of phonograph manufacturers

References

External links
 

Pro audio
Manufacturers of professional audio equipment
Audio amplifier manufacturers
Compact Disc player manufacturers
Japanese brands
Companies based in Shizuoka Prefecture
Loudspeaker manufacturers
Phonograph manufacturers
Audio mixing console manufacturers
Musical instrument manufacturing companies of Japan